The Anglican Church of St Mary in Oare, Somerset, England, was built in the 15th century. It is a Grade II* listed building.

History
The nave and inner chancel survive from a 15th-century building, but the outer chancel and tower were rebuilt in the 19th century.

The parish and benefice of Oare with Culbone is part of the Diocese of Bath and Wells.

The church was used as the location of a marriage in the novel Lorna Doone by R. D. Blackmore, whose grandfather had been the rector of the church between 1809 and 1842.

Architecture
The stone building has slate roofs. It consists of a three-bay nave, with an inner and outer chancel, each of one bay. The three-stage is unbuttressed.

Inside the church are 18th century box pews and a Norman font on an 18th-century base. There is also a 15th-century piscina with a "grotesque head", said to represent St Decuman.

References

Grade II* listed buildings in West Somerset
Grade II* listed churches in Somerset
Church of England church buildings in West Somerset